Kim Kwang-jin is the name of:

 Kim Kwang-jin (politician) (1927–1997), North Korean general and politician
 Kim Gwang-jin (born 1956), North Korean gymnast
 Kim Kwang-jin (skier) (born 1995), South Korean skier